Kalateh-ye Hajji Motalleb (also Romanized as Kalāteh-ye Ḩājjī Moţalleb) is a village in Tabas Rural District, in the Central District of Khoshab County, Razavi Khorasan Province, Iran. At the 2006 census, its population was 28, in 11 families.

References 

Populated places in Khoshab County